Władysław Łoziński also known as Wojtek ze Smolnicy and Władysław Lubicz (1843–1913) was a Polish writer, historian and art collector, known for his books about the Polish–Lithuanian Commonwealth.

Biography 
Born on 29 May 1843 in Opary near Sambir. His father Walerian Łozinski was a Post Office officer and mother Julia born Lewicka (Lewicki – family). The brother of Walery Łoziński, also a writer, and Bronisław Łoziński – lawyer, and cousin of historian – Karol Szajnocha. He studied philosophy at the University of Lwów, and was an editor of many Galician newspapers and magazines (Dziennik Literacki, Przegląd Powszechny, Gwiazdka Cieszyńska), and especially the Gazeta Lwowska which he reformed and expanded. He was the first secretary of the Ossolineum Foundation, vice-president of the Historical Institute (Towarzystwo Historyczne), president of the Society of Friends of Arts (Towarzystwo Przyjaciól Sztuk Pięknych) and from 1891 a member of the Academy of Skills (Akademia Umiejętności, a precursor of the Polish Academy of Learning). He was also a deputy from Galicia to the Austria-Hungary National Council in Vienna and later a member of the Lord's Chamber.

He died on 20 May 1913 in Lwów and buried at Lychakivskiy Cemetery.

Works 
Łoziński was the author of both fictional, historical novels and more academic studies. His interested centered on the Polish–Lithuanian Commonwealth.

Fiction:
 Oko proroka (Eye of the prophet) (1899)

Historical texts:
 Prawem i lewem. Obyczaje na Czerwonej Rusi w pierwszej połowie XVII wieku. (Right and wrong. The customs of Red Ruthenia in the first half of the 17th century) (1903)
 Życie polskie w dawnych wiekach (Life in Poland in old times) (1907)

Legacy 
Lozinski bequeathed his art collection to the city and the building accommodating it, the palace formerly owned by Isabella Diduszycka at 3 Stefanyka Street, to his nephew Valerii. During the political instability of 1914, Valerii sold the house to the City of Lviv, after which it became permanent home to the Lviv Art Gallery, now the Borys Voznytskyi Lviv National Museum.

1843 births
1913 deaths
20th-century Polish historians
Polish male non-fiction writers
Polish male writers
19th-century Polish historians